Vicente Cuadra Gomez (1874–1943), a member of one of Nicaragua's most illustrious families (Cuadra), was an economist and founded the Nicaraguan Chamber of Commerce in 1900.

Family and early life
His father was Jose Vicente Cuadra who served as president of Nicaragua in the early 1870s.  As a young man, he worked as his father's secretary and wrote about his experience in the Cartas y Recuerdos(1941). Cuadra and his wife (Victoria) had twelve children, many of them prominent in their own right in Nicaragua and in the United States.

Work
Vicente Cuadra Gomez was an economist and founded the Nicaraguan Chamber of Commerce in 1900, serving as the general manager until his death in 1943.

Sources 

1. Revista Conservadora del Pensamiento Centroamericano Vol XVII, Genealogia de la Familia Quadra, Agosto 1967

2. Cuadra – Chamberlain Family Interviews. PCCH Journal Vol 1, Fall 1971

1874 births
1943 deaths
Nicaraguan economists